I sette nani alla riscossa, internationally released as The Seven Dwarfs to the Rescue in 1965, is a 1951 Italian fantasy-comedy film directed by  Paolo W. Tamburella.

Cast

 Rossana Podestà: Princess Snow White
 Georges Marchal: The Black Prince 
 Roberto Risso: Prince Charming (Biondello)
 Ave Ninchi: The Nanny 
 Rossana Martini: The Handmaiden of Darkness 
 Guido Celano
 Pietro Tordi

References

External links
 

1951 films
1950s Italian-language films
Films based on Snow White
Films scored by Alessandro Cicognini
Italian fantasy comedy films
1950s fantasy comedy films
Italian black-and-white films
1950s Italian films